Thomas Edward Lawrence  (16 August 1888 – 19 May 1935) was a British archaeologist, army officer, diplomat, and writer who became renowned for his role in the Arab Revolt (1916–1918) and the Sinai and Palestine Campaign (1915–1918) against the Ottoman Empire during the First World War. The breadth and variety of his activities and associations, and his ability to describe them vividly in writing, earned him international fame as Lawrence of Arabia, a title used for the 1962 film based on his wartime activities.

He was born out of wedlock in August 1888 to Sarah Junner (1861–1959), a governess, and Sir Thomas Chapman, 7th Baronet (1846–1919), an Anglo-Irish nobleman. Chapman left his wife and family in Ireland to cohabit with Junner. Chapman and Junner called themselves Mr and Mrs Lawrence, using the surname of Sarah's likely father; her mother had been employed as a servant for a Lawrence family when she became pregnant with Sarah. In 1896, the Lawrences moved to Oxford, where Thomas attended the High School and then studied history at Jesus College, Oxford, from 1907 to 1910. Between 1910 and 1914 he worked as an archaeologist for the British Museum, chiefly at Carchemish in Ottoman Syria.

Soon after the outbreak of war in 1914 he volunteered for the British Army and was stationed at the Arab Bureau (established in 1916) intelligence unit in Egypt. In 1916, he travelled to Mesopotamia and to Arabia on intelligence missions and became involved with the Arab Revolt as a liaison to the Arab forces, along with other British officers, supporting the Arab Kingdom of Hejaz's independence war against its former overlord, the Ottoman Empire. He worked closely with Emir Faisal, a leader of the revolt, and he participated, sometimes as leader, in military actions against the Ottoman armed forces, culminating in the capture of Damascus in October 1918.

After the First World War, Lawrence joined the British Foreign Office, working with the British government and with Faisal. In 1922, he retreated from public life and spent the years until 1935 serving as an enlisted man, mostly in the Royal Air Force (RAF), with a brief period in the Army. During this time, he published his best-known work Seven Pillars of Wisdom (1926), an autobiographical account of his participation in the Arab Revolt. He also translated books into English, and wrote The Mint, which detailed his time in the Royal Air Force working as an ordinary aircraftman. He corresponded extensively and was friendly with well-known artists, writers, and politicians. For the RAF, he participated in the development of rescue motorboats.

Lawrence's public image resulted in part from the sensationalised reporting of the Arab revolt by American journalist Lowell Thomas, as well as from Seven Pillars of Wisdom. On 19 May 1935, Lawrence died, at the age of 46, six days after being injured in a motorcycle accident in Dorset.

Early life

Thomas Edward Lawrence was born on 16 August 1888 in Tremadog, Carnarvonshire, Wales, in a house named Gorphwysfa, now known as Snowdon Lodge. His Anglo-Irish father Thomas Chapman had left his wife Edith after he had a first son with Sarah Junner who had been governess to his daughters. Sarah had herself been an illegitimate child, having been born in Sunderland as the daughter of Elizabeth Junner, a servant employed by a family named Lawrence; she was dismissed four months before Sarah was born, and identified Sarah's father as "John Junner, Shipwright journeyman".

Lawrence's parents did not marry but lived together under the pseudonym Lawrence. In 1914, his father inherited the Chapman baronetcy based at Killua Castle, the ancestral family home in County Westmeath, Ireland. The couple had five sons, Thomas (called "Ned" by his immediate family) being the second eldest. From Wales, the family moved to Kirkcudbright, Galloway, in southwestern Scotland, then to Dinard in Brittany, then to Jersey.

The family lived at Langley Lodge (now demolished) from 1894 to 1896, set in private woods between the eastern borders of the New Forest and Southampton Water in Hampshire. The residence was isolated, and young Lawrence had many opportunities for outdoor activities and waterfront visits.

In the summer of 1896, the family moved to 2 Polstead Road in Oxford, where they lived until 1921. Lawrence attended the City of Oxford High School for Boys from 1896 until 1907, where one of the four houses was later named "Lawrence" in his honour; the school closed in 1966. Lawrence and one of his brothers became commissioned officers in the Church Lads' Brigade at St Aldate's Church.

Lawrence claimed that he ran away from home around 1905 and served for a few weeks as a boy soldier with the Royal Garrison Artillery at St Mawes Castle in Cornwall, from which he was bought out. However, no evidence of this appears in army records.

Travels, antiquities, and archaeology

At age 15, Lawrence and his schoolfriend Cyril Beeson cycled around Berkshire, Buckinghamshire, and Oxfordshire, visiting almost every village's parish church, studying their monuments and antiquities, and making rubbings of their monumental brasses. Lawrence and Beeson monitored building sites in Oxford and presented the Ashmolean Museum with anything that they found. The Ashmolean's Annual Report for 1906 said that the two teenage boys "by incessant watchfulness secured everything of antiquarian value which has been found." In the summers of 1906 and 1907, Lawrence toured France by bicycle, sometimes with Beeson, collecting photographs, drawings, and measurements of medieval castles. In August 1907, Lawrence wrote home: "The Chaignons & the Lamballe people complimented me on my wonderful French: I have been asked twice since I arrived what part of France I came from".

From 1907 to 1910, Lawrence read history at Jesus College, Oxford. In July and August 1908 he cycled  solo through France to the Mediterranean and back researching French castles. In the summer of 1909, he set out alone on a three-month walking tour of crusader castles in Ottoman Syria, during which he travelled  on foot. While at Jesus he was a keen member of the University Officers' Training Corps (OTC). He graduated with First Class Honours after submitting a thesis titled The Influence of the Crusades on European Military Architecture—to the End of the 12th Century, partly based on his field research with Beeson in France, and his solo research in France and the Middle East. Lawrence was fascinated by the Middle Ages; his brother Arnold wrote in 1937 that "medieval researches" were a "dream way of escape from bourgeois England".

In 1910, Lawrence was offered the opportunity to become a practising archaeologist at Carchemish, in the expedition that D. G. Hogarth was setting up on behalf of the British Museum. Hogarth arranged a "Senior Demyship" (a form of scholarship) for Lawrence at Magdalen College, Oxford, to fund his work at £100 a year. He sailed for Beirut in December 1910 and went to Byblos, where he studied Arabic. He then went to work on the excavations at Carchemish, near Jerablus in northern Syria, where he worked under Hogarth, R. Campbell Thompson of the British Museum, and Leonard Woolley until 1914. He later stated that everything which he had accomplished he owed to Hogarth. Lawrence met Gertrude Bell while excavating at Carchemish. He worked briefly with Flinders Petrie in 1912 at Kafr Ammar in Egypt.

At Carchemish, Lawrence was involved in a high-tension relationship with a German-led team working nearby on the Baghdad Railway at Jerablus. While there was never open combat, there was regular conflict over access to land and treatment of the local workforce; Lawrence gained experience in Middle Eastern leadership practices and conflict resolution.

In January 1914, Woolley and Lawrence were co-opted by the British military as an archaeological smokescreen for a British military survey of the Negev Desert. They were funded by the Palestine Exploration Fund to search for an area referred to in the Bible as the Wilderness of Zin, and they made an archaeological survey of the Negev Desert along the way. The Negev was strategically important, as an Ottoman army attacking Egypt would have to cross it. Woolley and Lawrence subsequently published a report of the expedition's archaeological findings, but a more important result was updated mapping of the area, with special attention to features of military relevance such as water sources. Lawrence also visited Aqaba and Shobek, not far from Petra.

Military intelligence

Following the outbreak of hostilities in August 1914, Lawrence did not immediately enlist in the British Army. He held back until October on the advice of S. F. Newcombe, when he was commissioned on the General List as temporary second lieutenant-interpreter. Before the end of the year, he was summoned by renowned archaeologist and historian Lieutenant Commander David Hogarth, his mentor at Carchemish, to the new Arab Bureau intelligence unit in Cairo, and he arrived in Cairo on 15 December 1914. The Bureau's chief was Brigadier-General Gilbert Clayton who reported to Egyptian High Commissioner Henry McMahon.

The situation was complex during 1915. There was a growing Arab-nationalist movement within the Arabic-speaking Ottoman territories, including many Arabs serving in the Ottoman armed forces. They were in contact with Sharif Hussein, Emir of Mecca, who was negotiating with the British and offering to lead an Arab uprising against the Ottomans. In exchange, he wanted a British guarantee of an independent Arab state including the Hejaz, Syria, and Mesopotamia. Such an uprising would have been helpful to Britain in its war against the Ottomans, lessening the threat against the Suez Canal. However, there was resistance from French diplomats who insisted that Syria's future was as a French colony, not an independent Arab state. There were also strong objections from the Government of India, which was nominally part of the British government but acted independently. Its vision was of Mesopotamia under British control serving as a granary for India; furthermore, it wanted to hold on to its Arabian outpost in Aden.

At the Arab Bureau, Lawrence supervised the preparation of maps, produced a daily bulletin for the British generals operating in the theatre, and interviewed prisoners. He was an advocate of a British landing at Alexandretta which never came to pass. He was also a consistent advocate of an independent Arab Syria.

The situation came to a crisis in October 1915, as Sharif Hussein demanded an immediate commitment from Britain, with the threat that he would otherwise throw his weight behind the Ottomans. This would create a credible Pan-Islamic message that could have been dangerous for Britain, which was in severe difficulties in the Gallipoli Campaign. The British replied with a letter from High Commissioner McMahon that was generally agreeable while reserving commitments concerning the Mediterranean coastline and Holy Land.

In the spring of 1916, Lawrence was dispatched to Mesopotamia to assist in relieving the Siege of Kut by some combination of starting an Arab uprising and bribing Ottoman officials. This mission produced no useful result. Meanwhile, the Sykes–Picot Agreement was being negotiated in London without the knowledge of British officials in Cairo, which awarded a large proportion of Syria to France. Further, it implied that the Arabs would have to conquer Syria's four great cities if they were to have any sort of state there: Damascus, Homs, Hama, and Aleppo. It is unclear at what point Lawrence became aware of the treaty's contents.

Arab Revolt

The Arab Revolt began in June 1916, but it bogged down after a few successes, with a real risk that the Ottoman forces would advance along the coast of the Red Sea and recapture Mecca. On 16 October 1916, Lawrence was sent to the Hejaz on an intelligence-gathering mission led by Ronald Storrs. He interviewed Sharif Hussein's sons Ali, Abdullah, and Faisal, and concluded that Faisal was the best candidate to lead the Revolt.

In November, S. F. Newcombe was assigned to lead a permanent British liaison to Faisal's staff. Newcombe had not yet arrived in the area and the matter was of some urgency, so Lawrence was sent in his place. In late December 1916, Faisal and Lawrence worked out a plan for repositioning the Arab forces to put the railway from Syria under threat while preventing the Ottoman forces around Medina from threatening Arab positions. Newcombe arrived while Lawrence was preparing to leave Arabia, but Faisal intervened urgently, asking that Lawrence's assignment become permanent.

Lawrence's most important contributions to the Arab Revolt were in the area of strategy and liaison with British Armed Forces, but he also participated personally in several military engagements:
 3 January 1917: Attack on an Ottoman outpost in the Hejaz
 26 March 1917: Attack on the railway at Aba el Naam
 11 June 1917: Attack on a bridge at Ras Baalbek
 2 July 1917: Defeat of the Ottoman forces at Aba el Lissan, an outpost of Aqaba
 18 September 1917: Attack on the railway near Mudawara
 27 September 1917: Attack on the railway, destroyed an engine
 7 November 1917: Following a failed attack on the Yarmuk bridges, blew up a train on the railway between Dera'a and Amman, suffering several wounds in the explosion and ensuing combat
 25–26 January 1918: The Battle of Tafilah, a region southeast of the Dead Sea, with Arab regulars under the command of Jafar Pasha al-Askari; the battle was a defensive engagement that turned into an offensive rout, and was described in the official history of the war as a "brilliant feat of arms". Lawrence was awarded the Distinguished Service Order for his leadership at Tafilah and was promoted to lieutenant colonel.
 March 1918: Attack on the railway near Aqaba
 19 April 1918: Attack using British armoured cars on Tell Shahm
 16 September 1918: Destruction of railway bridge between Amman and Dera'a
 26 September 1918: Attack on retreating Ottomans and Germans near the village of Tafas. The Ottoman forces massacred the villagers and then Arab forces in return massacred their prisoners with Lawrence's encouragement.

Lawrence made a  personal journey northward in June 1917, on the way to Aqaba, visiting Ras Baalbek, the outskirts of Damascus, and Azraq, Jordan. He met Arab nationalists, counselling them to avoid revolt until the arrival of Faisal's forces, and he attacked a bridge to create the impression of guerrilla activity. His findings were regarded by the British as extremely valuable and there was serious consideration of awarding him a Victoria Cross; in the end, he was invested as a Companion of the Order of the Bath and promoted to major.

Lawrence travelled regularly between British headquarters and Faisal, co-ordinating military action. But by early 1918, Faisal's chief British liaison was Lieutenant Colonel Pierce Charles Joyce, and Lawrence's time was chiefly devoted to raiding and intelligence-gathering.

Strategy
The chief elements of the Arab strategy which Faisal and Lawrence developed were to avoid capturing Medina, and to extend northward through Maan and Dera'a to Damascus and beyond. Faisal wanted to lead regular attacks against the Ottomans, but Lawrence persuaded him to drop that tactic. Lawrence wrote about the Bedouin as a fighting force:
The value of the tribes is defensive only and their real sphere is guerilla warfare. They are intelligent, and very lively, almost reckless, but too individualistic to endure commands, or fight in line, or to help each other. It would, I think, be possible to make an organized force out of them.… The Hejaz war is one of dervishes against regular forces—and we are on the side of the dervishes. Our text-books do not apply to its conditions at all.

Medina was an attractive target for the revolt as Islam's second-holiest site, and because its Ottoman garrison was weakened by disease and isolation. It became clear that it was advantageous to leave it there rather than try to capture it, while attacking the Hejaz railway south from Damascus without permanently destroying it. This prevented the Ottomans from making effective use of their troops at Medina, and forced them to dedicate many resources to defending and repairing the railway line. However, Aldington strongly disagrees with the value of the strategy.

It is not known when Lawrence learned the details of the Sykes–Picot Agreement, nor if or when he briefed Faisal on what he knew, however, there is good reason to think that both these things happened, and earlier rather than later. In particular, the Arab strategy of northward extension makes perfect sense given the Sykes-Picot language that spoke of an independent Arab entity in Syria, which would only be granted if the Arabs liberated the territory themselves. The French and some of their British Liaison officers were specifically uncomfortable about the northward movement, as it would weaken French colonial claims.

Capture of Aqaba

In 1917, Lawrence proposed a joint action with the Arab irregulars and forces including Auda Abu Tayi, who had previously been in the employ of the Ottomans, against the strategically located but lightly defended town of Aqaba on the Red Sea. Aqaba could have been attacked from the sea, but the narrow defiles leading through the mountains were strongly defended and would have been very difficult to assault. The expedition was led by Sharif Nasir of Medina.

Lawrence avoided informing his British superiors about the details of the planned inland attack, due to concern that it would be blocked as contrary to French interests. The expedition departed from Wejh on 9 May, and Aqaba fell to the Arab forces on 6 July, after a surprise overland attack which took the Turkish defences from behind. After Aqaba, General Sir Edmund Allenby, the new commander-in-chief of the Egyptian Expeditionary Force, agreed to Lawrence's strategy for the revolt. Lawrence now held a powerful position as an adviser to Faisal and a person who had Allenby's confidence, as Allenby acknowledged after the war:

Dera'a
Lawrence describes an episode on 20 November 1917 while reconnoitring Dera'a in disguise, when he was captured by the Ottoman military, beaten, and sexually assaulted by the local bey and his guardsmen, though he does not specify the nature of the sexual contact. Some scholars have stated that he exaggerated the severity of the injuries that he suffered, or alleged that the episode never happened. There is no independent testimony, but the multiple consistent reports and the absence of evidence for outright invention in Lawrence's works make the account believable to some of his biographers. Malcolm Brown, John E. Mack, and Jeremy Wilson have argued that this episode had strong psychological effects on Lawrence, which may explain some of his unconventional behaviour in later life. Lawrence ended his account of the episode in Seven Pillars of Wisdom with the statement: "In Dera'a that night the citadel of my integrity had been irrevocably lost."

Fall of Damascus

Lawrence was involved in the build-up to the capture of Damascus in the final weeks of the war, but he was not present at the city's formal surrender. He arrived several hours after the city had fallen, entering Damascus around 9 am on 1 October 1918; the first to arrive was the 10th Light Horse Regiment led by Major A. C. N. "Harry" Olden, who accepted the formal surrender of the city from acting Governor Emir Said. Lawrence was instrumental in establishing a provisional Arab government under Faisal in newly liberated Damascus, which he had envisioned as the capital of an Arab state. Faisal's rule as king, however, came to an abrupt end in 1920, after the battle of Maysaloun when the French Forces of General Henri Gouraud entered Damascus under the command of General Mariano Goybet, destroying Lawrence's dream of an independent Arabia.

During the closing years of the war, Lawrence sought to convince his superiors in the British government that Arab independence was in their interests, but he met with mixed success. The secret Sykes-Picot Agreement between France and Britain contradicted the promises of independence that he had made to the Arabs and frustrated his work.

Post-war years
Lawrence returned to the United Kingdom a full colonel. Immediately after the war, he worked for the Foreign Office, attending the Paris Peace Conference between January and May as a member of Faisal's delegation. On 17 May 1919, a Handley Page Type O/400 taking Lawrence to Egypt crashed at the airport of Roma-Centocelle. The pilot and co-pilot were killed; Lawrence survived with a broken shoulder blade and two broken ribs. During his brief hospitalisation, he was visited by King Victor Emmanuel III of Italy.

In 1918, Lowell Thomas went to Jerusalem where he met Lawrence, "whose enigmatic figure in Arab uniform fired his imagination", in the words of author Rex Hall. Thomas and his cameraman Harry Chase shot a great deal of film and many photographs involving Lawrence. Thomas produced a stage presentation entitled With Allenby in Palestine which included a lecture, dancing, and music and depicted the Middle East as exotic, mysterious, sensuous, and violent.
The show premiered in New York in March 1919. He was invited to take his show to England, and he agreed to do so provided that he was personally invited by the King and provided the use of either Drury Lane or Covent Garden. He opened at Covent Garden on 14 August 1919 and continued for hundreds of lectures, "attended by the highest in the land".

Initially, Lawrence played only a supporting role in the show, as the main focus was on Allenby's campaigns; but then Thomas realised that it was the photos of Lawrence dressed as a Bedouin which had captured the public's imagination, so he had Lawrence photographed again in London in Arab dress. With the new photos, Thomas re-launched his show under the new title With Allenby in Palestine and Lawrence in Arabia in early 1920, which proved to be extremely popular. The new title elevated Lawrence from a supporting role to a co-star of the Near Eastern campaign and reflected a changed emphasis. Thomas' shows made the previously obscure Lawrence into a household name. Lawrence worked with Thomas on the creation of the presentation, answering many questions and posing for many photographs. After its success, however, he expressed regret about having been featured in it.

Lawrence served as an advisor to Winston Churchill at the Colonial Office for just over a year starting in February 1920. He hated bureaucratic work, writing on 21 May 1921 to Robert Graves: "I wish I hadn't gone out there: the Arabs are like a page I have turned over; and sequels are rotten things. I'm locked up here: office every day and much of it". He travelled to the Middle East on multiple occasions during this period, at one time holding the title of "chief political officer for Trans-Jordania". He campaigned for his and Churchill's vision of the Middle East, publishing pieces in multiple newspapers, including The Times, The Observer, The Daily Mail, and The Daily Express.

Lawrence had a sinister reputation in France during his lifetime and even today as an implacable "enemy of France", the man who was constantly stirring up the Syrians to rebel against French rule throughout the 1920s. However, French historian Maurice Larès wrote that the real reason for France's problems in Syria was that the Syrians did not want to be ruled by France, and the French needed a scapegoat to blame for their difficulties in ruling the country. Larès wrote that Lawrence is usually pictured in France as a Francophobe, but he was really a Francophile.

Having seen and admired the effective use of air power during the war, Lawrence enlisted in the Royal Air Force as an aircraftman, under the name John Hume Ross in August 1922. At the RAF recruiting centre in Covent Garden, London, he was interviewed by recruiting officer Flying Officer W. E. Johns, later known as the author of the Biggles series of novels. Johns rejected Lawrence's application, as he suspected that "Ross" was a false name. Lawrence admitted that this was so and that he had provided false documents. He left, but returned some time later with an RAF messenger who carried a written order that Johns must accept Lawrence.

However, Lawrence was forced out of the RAF in February 1923 after his identity was exposed. He changed his name to T. E. Shaw (apparently as a consequence of his friendship with G. B. and Charlotte Shaw) and joined the Royal Tank Corps later that year. He was unhappy there and repeatedly petitioned to rejoin the RAF, which finally readmitted him in August 1925. A fresh burst of publicity after the publication of Revolt in the Desert resulted in his assignment to bases at Karachi and Miramshah in British India (now Pakistan) in late 1926, where he remained until the end of 1928. At that time, he was forced to return to Britain after rumours began to circulate that he was involved in espionage activities.

He purchased several small plots of land in Chingford, built a hut and swimming pool there, and visited frequently. The hut was removed in 1930 when Chingford Urban District Council acquired the land; it was given to the City of London Corporation which re-erected it in the grounds of The Warren, Loughton. Lawrence's tenure of the Chingford land has now been commemorated by a plaque fixed on the sighting obelisk on Pole Hill.

Lawrence continued serving in the RAF based at RAF Mount Batten near Plymouth, RAF Calshot near Southampton, and RAF Bridlington, East Riding of Yorkshire. He specialised in high-speed boats and professed happiness, and he left the service with considerable regret at the end of his enlistment in March 1935.

In late August or early September 1931 he stayed with Lady Houston aboard her luxury yacht, the Liberty, off Calshot, shortly before the Schneider Trophy competition. In later letters Lady Houston would ask Lawrence's advice on obtaining a new chauffeur for her Rolls-Royce car ("Forgive my asking, but you know everything") and suggest that he join the Liberty, for she had discharged her captain, who had turned out to be a "wrong 'un."

In the inter-war period, the RAF's Marine Craft Section began to commission air-sea rescue launches capable of higher speeds and greater capacity. The arrival of high-speed craft into the MCS was driven in part by Lawrence. He had previously witnessed a seaplane crew drowning when the seaplane tender sent to their rescue was too slow in arriving. These boats had a range of  when cruising at 24 knots and could achieve a top speed of 29 knots.

Death

Lawrence was a keen motorcyclist and owned eight Brough Superior motorcycles at different times. His last SS100 (Registration GW 2275) is privately owned but has been on loan to the National Motor Museum, Beaulieu and the Imperial War Museum in London. He was also an avid reader of Thomas Malory's Le Morte d'Arthur and carried a copy on his campaigns. He read an account of Eugene Vinaver's discovery of the Winchester Manuscript of the Morte in The Times in 1934, and he motorcycled from Manchester to Winchester to meet Vinaver.

On 13 May 1935, Lawrence was fatally injured in an accident on his Brough Superior SS100 motorcycle in Dorset close to his cottage Clouds Hill, near Wareham, just two months after leaving military service. A dip in the road obstructed his view of two boys on their bicycles; he swerved to avoid them, lost control, and was thrown over the handlebars. He died six days later on 19 May 1935, aged 46. The location of the crash is marked by a small memorial at the roadside. One of the doctors attending him was neurosurgeon Hugh Cairns, who consequently began a long study of the loss of life by motorcycle dispatch riders through head injuries. His research led to the use of crash helmets by both military and civilian motorcyclists.

The Moreton estate borders Bovington Camp, and Lawrence bought Clouds Hill from his cousins, the Frampton family. He had been a frequent visitor to their home, Okers Wood House, and had corresponded with Louisa Frampton for years. Lawrence's mother arranged with the Framptons to have his body buried in their family plot in the separate burial ground of St Nicholas' Church, Moreton. The coffin was transported on the Frampton estate's bier. Mourners included Winston Churchill, E. M. Forster, Lady Astor, and Lawrence's youngest brother Arnold. Churchill described him like this: "Lawrence was one of those beings whose pace of life was faster and more intense than what is normal."

Writings

Lawrence was a prolific writer throughout his life, a large portion of which was epistolary; he often sent several letters a day, and several collections of his letters have been published. He corresponded with many notable figures, including George Bernard Shaw, Edward Elgar, Winston Churchill, Robert Graves, Noël Coward, E. M. Forster, Siegfried Sassoon, John Buchan, Augustus John, and Henry Williamson. He met Joseph Conrad and commented perceptively on his works. Lawrence sent many letters to Shaw's wife, Charlotte.

Lawrence was a competent speaker of French and Arabic, and reader of Latin and Ancient Greek. Lawrence published three major texts in his lifetime. The most significant was his account of the Arab Revolt in Seven Pillars of Wisdom. Homer's Odyssey and The Forest Giant were translations, the latter an otherwise forgotten work of French fiction. He received a flat fee for the second translation, and negotiated a generous fee plus royalties for the first.

Seven Pillars of Wisdom

Lawrence's major work is Seven Pillars of Wisdom, an account of his war experiences. In 1919, he was elected to a seven-year research fellowship at All Souls College, Oxford, providing him with support while he worked on the book. Certain parts of the book also serve as essays on military strategy, Arabian culture and geography, and other topics. He rewrote Seven Pillars of Wisdom three times, once "blind" after he lost the manuscript.

There are many alleged "embellishments" in Seven Pillars, though some allegations have been disproved with time, most definitively in Jeremy Wilson's authorised biography. However, Lawrence's own notebooks refute his claim to have crossed the Sinai Peninsula from Aqaba to the Suez Canal in just 49 hours without any sleep. In reality, this famous camel ride lasted for more than 70 hours and was interrupted by two long breaks for sleeping, which Lawrence omitted when he wrote his book.

In the preface, Lawrence acknowledged George Bernard Shaw's help in editing the book. The first edition was published in 1926 as a high-priced private subscription edition, printed in London by Herbert John Hodgson and Roy Manning Pike, with illustrations by Eric Kennington, Augustus John, Paul Nash, Blair Hughes-Stanton, and Hughes-Stanton's wife Gertrude Hermes. Lawrence was afraid that the public would think that he would make a substantial income from the book, and he stated that it was written as a result of his war service. He vowed not to take any money from it, and indeed he did not, as the sale price was one third of the production costs, leaving him in substantial debt. He always took care not to give the impression that he had profited economically from the Arab revolt. In a 'deleted chapter' of the Seven Pillars which reappeared in 2022, Lawrence wrote: 

As a specialist in the Middle East, Fred Halliday praised Lawrence's Seven Pillars of Wisdom as a "fine work of prose" but described its relevance to the study of Arab history and society as "almost worthless."

Revolt in the Desert

Revolt in the Desert was an abridged version of Seven Pillars that he began in 1926 and that was published in March 1927 in both limited and trade editions. He undertook a needed but reluctant publicity exercise, which resulted in a best-seller. Again he vowed not to take any fees from the publication, partly to appease the subscribers to Seven Pillars who had paid dearly for their editions. By the fourth reprint in 1927, the debt from Seven Pillars was paid off. As Lawrence left for military service in India at the end of 1926, he set up the "Seven Pillars Trust" with his friend D. G. Hogarth as a trustee, in which he made over the copyright and any surplus income of Revolt in the Desert. He later told Hogarth that he had "made the Trust final, to save myself the temptation of reviewing it, if Revolt turned out a best seller."

The resultant trust paid off the debt, and Lawrence then invoked a clause in his publishing contract to halt publication of the abridgement in the United Kingdom. However, he allowed both American editions and translations, which resulted in a substantial flow of income. The trust paid income either into an educational fund for children of RAF officers who lost their lives or were invalided as a result of service, or more substantially into the RAF Benevolent Fund.

Posthumous
Lawrence left The Mint unpublished, a memoir of his experiences as an enlisted man in the Royal Air Force (RAF). For this, he worked from a notebook that he kept while enlisted, writing of the daily lives of enlisted men and his desire to be a part of something larger than himself. The book is stylistically different from Seven Pillars of Wisdom, using sparse prose as opposed to the complicated syntax found in Seven Pillars. It was published posthumously, edited by his brother Arnold.

After Lawrence's death, A. W. Lawrence inherited Lawrence's estate and his copyrights as the sole beneficiary. To pay the inheritance tax, he sold the US copyright of Seven Pillars of Wisdom (subscribers' text) outright to Doubleday Doran in 1935. Doubleday controlled publication rights of this version of the text of Seven Pillars of Wisdom in the US until the copyright expired at the end of 2022 (publication plus 95 years). In 1936, A. W. Lawrence split the remaining assets of the estate, giving Clouds Hill and many copies of less substantial or historical letters to the National Trust, and then set up two trusts to control interests in his brother's residual copyrights. He assigned the copyright in Seven Pillars of Wisdom to the Seven Pillars of Wisdom Trust, and it was given its first general publication as a result. He assigned the copyright in The Mint and all Lawrence's letters to the Letters and Symposium Trust, which he edited and published in the book T. E. Lawrence by his Friends in 1937.

A substantial amount of income went directly to the RAF Benevolent Fund and to archaeological, environmental, and academic projects. The two trusts were amalgamated in 1986, and the unified trust acquired all the remaining rights to Lawrence's works that it had not owned on the death of A. W. Lawrence in 1991, plus rights to all of A. W. Lawrence's works. The UK copyrights on Lawrence's works published in his lifetime and within 20 years of his death expired on 1 January 2006. Works published more than 20 years after his death were protected for 50 years from publication or to 1 January 2040, whichever is earlier.

Writings 
 Arab Memorandum to the Paris Peace Conference (1919)
 Seven Pillars of Wisdom, an account of Lawrence's part in the Arab Revolt.
 Revolt in the Desert, an abridged version of Seven Pillars of Wisdom.
 The Mint, an account of Lawrence's service in the Royal Air Force.
 Crusader Castles, Lawrence's Oxford thesis. London: Michael Haag 1986. The first edition was published in London in 1936 by the Golden Cockerel Press, in 2 volumes, limited to 1000 editions.
 The Odyssey of Homer, Lawrence's translation from the Greek, first published in 1932.
 The Forest Giant, by Adrien Le Corbeau, novel, Lawrence's translation from the French, 1924.
 The Letters of T. E. Lawrence, selected and edited by Malcolm Brown. London, J. M Dent. 1988
 The Letters of T. E. Lawrence, edited by David Garnett.
 T. E. Lawrence. Letters, Jeremy Wilson. (See prospectus)
 Minorities: Good Poems by Small Poets and Small Poems by Good Poets, edited by Jeremy Wilson, 1971. Lawrence's commonplace book includes an introduction by Wilson that explains how the poems comprising the book reflected Lawrence's life and thoughts.
 Guerrilla Warfare, article in the 1929 Encyclopædia Britannica
 The Wilderness of Zin, by C. Leonard Woolley and T. E. Lawrence. London, Harrison and Sons, 1914.
 Oriental Assembly (1939)

Sexuality
Lawrence's biographers have discussed his sexuality at considerable length and this discussion has spilled into the popular press. There is no direct evidence for consensual sexual intimacy between Lawrence and any person. His friends have expressed the opinion that he was asexual, and Lawrence himself specifically denied any personal experience of sex in multiple private letters. There were suggestions that Lawrence had been intimate with his companion Selim Ahmed, "Dahoum", who worked with him at a pre-war archaeological dig in Carchemish, and fellow serviceman R. A. M. Guy, but his biographers and contemporaries found them unconvincing.

The dedication to his book Seven Pillars is a poem titled "To S.A." which opens:

Lawrence was never specific about the identity of "S.A." Many theories argue in favour of individual men or women, and the Arab nation as a whole. The most popular theory is that S.A. represents (at least in part) Dahoum, who apparently died of typhus before 1918.

Lawrence lived in a period of strong official opposition to homosexuality, but his writing on the subject was tolerant. He wrote to Charlotte Shaw, "I've seen lots of man-and-man loves: very lovely and fortunate some of them were." He refers to "the openness and honesty of perfect love" on one occasion in Seven Pillars, when discussing relationships between young male fighters in the war. The passage in the front matter is referred to with the single-word tag "Sex".

He wrote in Chapter 1 of Seven Pillars:

There is considerable evidence that Lawrence was a masochist. He wrote in his description of the Dera'a beating that "a delicious warmth, probably sexual, was swelling through me," and he also included a detailed description of the guards' whip in a style typical of masochists' writing. In later life, Lawrence arranged to pay a military colleague to administer beatings to him, and to be subjected to severe formal tests of fitness and stamina. John Bruce first wrote on this topic, including some other statements that were not credible, but Lawrence's biographers regard the beatings as established fact. French novelist André Malraux admired Lawrence but wrote that he had a "taste for self-humiliation, now by discipline and now by veneration; a horror of respectability; a disgust for possessions". Biographer Lawrence James wrote that the evidence suggested a "strong homosexual masochism", noting that he never sought punishment from women.

Psychologist John E. Mack sees a possible connection between Lawrence's masochism and the childhood beatings that he had received from his mother for routine misbehaviours. His brother Arnold thought that the beatings had been given for the purpose of breaking his brother's will. Angus Calder suggested in 1997 that Lawrence's apparent masochism and self-loathing might have stemmed from a sense of guilt over losing his brothers Frank and Will on the Western Front, along with many other school friends, while he survived.

Aldington controversy
In 1955 Richard Aldington published Lawrence of Arabia: A Biographical Enquiry, a sustained attack on Lawrence's character, writing, accomplishments, and truthfulness. Specifically, Aldington alleged that Lawrence lied and exaggerated continuously, promoted a misguided policy in the Middle East, that his strategy of containing but not capturing Medina was incorrect, and that Seven Pillars of Wisdom was a bad book with few redeeming features. He also revealed Lawrence's illegitimacy and strongly suggested that he was homosexual. For example: "Seven Pillars of Wisdom is rather a work of quasi-fiction than history.", and "It was seldom that he reported any fact or episode involving himself without embellishing them and indeed in some cases entirely inventing them."

It is significant that Aldington was a colonialist, arguing that the French colonial administration of Syria (resisted by Lawrence) had benefited that country and that Arabia's peoples were "far enough advanced for some government though not for complete self-government." He was also a Francophile, railing against Lawrence's "Francophobia, a hatred and an envy so irrational, so irresponsible and so unscrupulous that it is fair to say his attitude towards Syria was determined more by hatred of France than by devotion to the 'Arabs' – a convenient propaganda word which grouped many disharmonious and even mutually hostile tribes and peoples."

Prior to the publication of Aldington's book, its contents became known in London's literary community. A group Aldington and some subsequent authors referred to as "The Lawrence Bureau", led by B. H. Liddell Hart, tried energetically, starting in 1954, to have the book suppressed. When that effort failed, Hart prepared and distributed hundreds of copies of Aldington's 'Lawrence': His Charges – and Treatment of the Evidence, a 7-page single-spaced document. This worked: Aldington's book received many extremely negative and even abusive reviews, with strong evidence that some reviewers had read Liddell's rebuttal but not Aldington's book.

Aldington wrote that Lawrence embellished many stories and invented others, and in particular that his claims involving numbers were usually inflated – for example claims of having read 50,000 books in the Oxford Union library, of having blown up 79 bridges, of having had a price of £50,000 on his head, and of having suffered 60 or more injuries. Many of Aldington's specific claims against Lawrence have been accepted by subsequent biographers. In Richard Aldington and Lawrence of Arabia: A Cautionary Tale, Fred D. Crawford writes "Much that shocked in 1955 is now standard knowledge – that TEL was illegitimate, that this profoundly troubled him, that he frequently resented his mother's dominance, that such reminiscences as T. E. Lawrence by His Friends are not reliable, that TEL's leg-pulling and other adolescent traits could be offensive, that TEL took liberties with the truth in his official reports and Seven Pillars, that the significance of his exploits during the Arab Revolt was more political than military, that he contributed to his own myth, that when he vetted the books by Graves and Liddell Hart he let remain much that he knew was untrue, and that his feelings about publicity were ambiguous."

This has not prevented most post-Aldington biographers (including Fred D. Crawford, who studied Aldington's claims intensely) from expressing strong admiration for Lawrence's military, political, and writing achievements.

Awards and commemorations

Lawrence was appointed a Companion of the Order of the Bath on 7 August 1917, appointed a Companion of the Distinguished Service Order on 10 May 1918, awarded the Knight of the Legion of Honour (France) on 30 May 1916 and the Croix de guerre (France) on 16 April 1918. He was mentioned in despatches by Sir John Maxwell (General Officer Commanding, Egypt) on 16 March 1916, by Sir Percy Lake (Commanding Indian Expeditionary Force D) on 12 August 1916, and by Sir Reginald Wingate (General Officer Commanding, Hedjaz) on 27 December 1918.

King George V offered Lawrence a knighthood on 30 October 1918 at a private audience in Buckingham Palace for his services in the Arab Revolt, but he declined. He was unwilling to accept the honour in light of how his country had betrayed the Arabs.

A bronze bust of Lawrence by Eric Kennington was placed in the crypt of St Paul's Cathedral, London, on 29 January 1936, alongside the tombs of Britain's greatest military leaders. A recumbent stone effigy by Kennington was installed in St Martin's Church, Wareham, Dorset, in 1939.

An English Heritage blue plaque marks Lawrence's childhood home at 2 Polstead Road, Oxford, and another appears on his London home at 14 Barton Street, Westminster. In 2002, Lawrence was named 53rd in the BBC's list of the 100 Greatest Britons following a UK-wide vote.

In 2018, Lawrence was featured on a £5 coin (issued in silver and gold) in a six-coin set commemorating the Centenary of the First World War produced by the Royal Mint.

In popular culture

Film
 Alexander Korda bought the film rights to The Seven Pillars in the 1930s. The production was in development, with various actors cast as the lead, such as Leslie Howard.
 Peter O'Toole was nominated for an Academy Award for Best Actor for his portrayal of Lawrence in the 1962 film Lawrence of Arabia. In 2003, the American Film Institute ranked his portrayal as the 10th greatest film hero of all time.
 Lawrence was portrayed by Robert Pattinson in the 2014 biographical drama about Gertrude Bell, Queen of the Desert.
 Lawrence: After Arabia, a 2021 independent film written and directed by Mark J.T. Griffin, posits that Lawrence, a man with many enemies, mainly because of his connections to pro-German, anti-war figures in Britain and to the Arabs, was assassinated.
 Peter O'Toole's portrayal of Lawrence inspired behavioural affectations in the android David, portrayed by Michael Fassbender in the 2012 film Prometheus, and its 2017 sequel Alien: Covenant, part of the Alien franchise.

Literature
 T. E. Lawrence (T. E.ロレンス) is a seven-volume manga series by Tomoko Kosaka, which retells Lawrence's life story from childhood onward.
 The Oath of the Five Lords tells a fictional story including several references to Lawrence and his memoirs in which he describes how the United Kingdom did not honour its promises to the Arab nation. The comic is the twenty-first book in the Blake and Mortimer comic series. The story was written by Yves Sente and drawn by André Juillard and was released in 2012.
 The T. E. Lawrence Poems was published by Canadian poet Gwendolyn MacEwen in 1982. The poems rely heavily, and quote directly from, primary material including Seven Pillars and the collected letters.

Television
 He was portrayed by Judson Scott in the 1982 TV series Voyagers!
 Ralph Fiennes portrayed Lawrence in the 1992 British made-for-TV film A Dangerous Man: Lawrence After Arabia.
 Joseph A. Bennett and Douglas Henshall portrayed him in the 1992 TV series The Young Indiana Jones Chronicles.
 He was also portrayed in a Syrian series, directed by Thaer Mousa, called Lawrence Al Arab. The series consisted of 37 episodes, each between 45 minutes and one hour in length.

Theatre
 Lawrence was the subject of Terence Rattigan's controversial play Ross, which explored Lawrence's alleged homosexuality. Ross ran in London in 1960–1961, starring Alec Guinness, who was an admirer of Lawrence, and Gerald Harper as his blackmailer, Dickinson. The play had been written as a screenplay, but the planned film was never made. In January 1986 at the Theatre Royal, Plymouth, on the opening night of the revival of Ross, Marc Sinden, who was playing Dickinson (the man who recognised and blackmailed Lawrence, played by Simon Ward), was introduced to the man on whom the character of Dickinson was based. Sinden asked him why he had blackmailed Ross, and he replied, "Oh, for the money. I was financially embarrassed at the time and needed to get up to London to see a girlfriend. It was never meant to be a big thing, but a good friend of mine was very close to Terence Rattigan and years later, the silly devil told him the story."
 Alan Bennett's play Forty Years On (1968) includes a satire on Lawrence; known as "Tee Hee Lawrence" because of his high-pitched, girlish giggle. "Clad in the magnificent white silk robes of an Arab prince ... he hoped to pass unnoticed through London. Alas he was mistaken."
 The character of Private Napoleon Meek in George Bernard Shaw's 1931 play Too True to Be Good was inspired by Lawrence. Meek is depicted as conversant with the language and lifestyle of the native tribes. He repeatedly enlists with the army, quitting whenever offered a promotion. Lawrence attended a performance of the play's original Worcestershire run, and reportedly signed autographs for patrons attending the show.
 Lawrence's first year back at Oxford after the War to write was portrayed by Tom Rooney in a play, The Oxford Roof Climbers Rebellion, written by Stephen Massicotte (premiered Toronto 2006). The play explores Lawrence's reactions to war, and his friendship with Robert Graves. Urban Stages presented the U.S. premiere in New York City in October 2007; Lawrence was portrayed by actor Dylan Chalfy.
 Lawrence's final years are portrayed in a one-man show by Raymond Sargent, The Warrior and the Poet.
 His 1922 retreat from public life forms the subject of Howard Brenton's play Lawrence After Arabia, commissioned for a 2016 premiere at the Hampstead Theatre to mark the centenary of the outbreak of the Arab Revolt.
 A highly fictionalised version of Lawrence featured in the 2016 Swedish-language comedic play Lawrence i Mumiedalen.
 Lawrence's years during the First World War, working for the British Army, is portrayed in a 2022 production at the Théâtre du Gymnase (Paris, France). The play was staged by Eric Bouvron, and notably emphasises his role in the sabotage of the Hejaz railway, portraying the perceived perfidy of the Sykes–Picot Agreement, and is marked by strong themes of imperialism and loyalty, both personal and national.

See also

 Hashemites, ruling family of Mecca (10th–20th century) and of Jordan since 1921
 Kingdom of Iraq (1932–1958)
 Lawrence of Arabia: The Authorised Biography of T. E. Lawrence by Jeremy Wilson (1989)
 The Adventures of Young Indiana Jones, US TV series (1992–1993) with episodes depicting moments from Lawrence's life
Related individuals
 Richard Meinertzhagen (1878–1967), British intelligence officer and ornithologist, on occasion a colleague of Lawrence's
 Rafael de Nogales Méndez (1879–1937), Venezuelan officer who served in the Ottoman Army and was compared to Lawrence
 Suleiman Mousa (1919–2008), Jordanian historian who wrote about Lawrence
 Oskar von Niedermayer (1885–1948), German officer, professor and spy, sometimes referred to as the German Lawrence
 Max von Oppenheim (1860–1946), German-Jewish lawyer, diplomat and archaeologist. Lawrence called his travelogue "the best book on the [Middle East] area I know".
 Wilhelm Wassmuss (1880–1931), German diplomat and spy, known as "Wassmuss of Persia" and compared to Lawrence

References

Sources

Further reading

External links

Digital collections
 
 
 
 T. E. Lawrence's Original Letters on Palestine Shapell Manuscript Foundation

Physical collections
 T. E. Lawrence's Collection at The University of Texas at Austin's Harry Ransom Center
 "Creating History: Lowell Thomas and Lawrence of Arabia" online history exhibit at Clio Visualizing History.
 Europeana Collections 1914–1918 makes 425,000 World War I items from European libraries available online, including manuscripts, photographs and diaries by or relating to Lawrence
 T. E. Lawrence's Personal Manuscripts and Letters

News and analysis
 The Guardian 19 May 1935 – The death of Lawrence of Arabia
 The Legend of Lawrence of Arabia: The Recalcitrant Hero
 T. E. Lawrence: The Enigmatic Lawrence of Arabia article by O'Brien Browne
 Lawrence of Arabia: True and false (an Arab view) by Lucy Ladikoff
 

Documentaries
 Footage of Lawrence of Arabia with publisher FN Doubleday and at a picnic
 Lawrence of Arabia: The Battle for the Arab World, directed by James Hawes. PBS Home Video, 21 October 2003. (ASIN B0000BWVND)

Societies
 T. E. Lawrence Studies, built by Lawrence's authorised biographer Jeremy Wilson (no longer maintained)
 The T. E. Lawrence Society

 
1888 births
1935 deaths
19th-century Anglo-Irish people
20th-century Anglo-Irish people
20th-century British archaeologists
20th-century British writers
20th-century translators
Alumni of Jesus College, Oxford
Alumni of Magdalen College, Oxford
Arab Bureau officers
Arab Revolt
British Army General List officers
British Army personnel of World War I
British guerrillas
British people of Irish descent
Burials in Dorset
Castellologists
Chevaliers of the Légion d'honneur
Companions of the Distinguished Service Order
Companions of the Order of the Bath
Fellows of All Souls College, Oxford
French–English translators
Greek–English translators
Guerrilla warfare theorists
Motorcycle road incident deaths
People educated at the City of Oxford High School for Boys
People from Caernarfonshire
People of Anglo-Irish descent
People of the Arab Revolt
Road incident deaths in England
Royal Air Force airmen
Royal Garrison Artillery soldiers
Royal Tank Regiment soldiers
Translators of Homer